is a city in Ōita Prefecture on the island of Kyushu, Japan. Beppu is famous for its hot springs.

Geography
Beppu is situated at the west end of Beppu Bay, around the east central prefecture. The north, west, and east of the city are the mountains or highlands with elevations of several hundreds meters above sea level. Most of those mountains are Quaternary volcanos. Particularly, such mountain as Mount Tsurumi is relatively new, and fumarolic activities are observed. Besides Mount Tsurumi, Mount Yufu, Mount Ohira and so forth shape a range of mountains.

The west area of the city includes a number of scenic locations such as Yufugawa Canyon, which has been selected as one of One Hundred View of Oita, and/or some designated areas of Aso Kujū National Park, with a large amount of forests.

The east area of the city consists of an alluvial fan as well as alluvial plain, made with rivers flowing into Beppu Bay, namely Asami River, Haruki River and Sakai River. The main urban area of Beppu has been formed within this relatively narrow land which spans approximately 5 km from east to west and 10 km from north to south.

There are a large number of faults on the north and south of the alluvial fan, surrounding the urban area. Given the short distance from the sea shore on the east coast to the west part of the city with altitude of several hundreds meters or higher, the city has many slopes mainly on the east-west direction.

Neighboring municipalities

Oita
Usa
Yufu
Hiji

History

The city was founded on April 1, 1924, with its population of 36,276.

Hot springs

Beppu is famous for its onsen (hot springs). It has eight major geothermal hot spots, sometimes referred to as the "eight hells of Beppu" among many others. Six of these are located close by within in the Kannawa district up the hill, and two are in the nearby Shibaseki district down the hill.

Beppu Hattō hot spring areas
Some hot springs in the Beppu area are Beppu Onsen,
Kankaiji, Kamegawa, Shibaseki, Kannawa, Myoban, Horita, Hamawaki, among others.

In addition, Oniyama Jigoku, known as "monster mountain hell" for the large numbers of crocodiles bred and kept on the grounds surrounding this hot spring, is nearby.

Visitor attractions
Beppu is part of the course of the annual Beppu-Ōita Marathon, which traces a path between Beppu and its neighboring city of Ōita. The competition has been held every year since 1952 and is classed as an IAAF Silver Label road race.

Otobaru Waterfall is a local natural attraction, located in the mountain area of Beppu city, 20 minutes' walk from Wonder Rakutenchi, a traditional amusement park. Takasakiyama Monkey Park is located 10 minutes from the center of Beppu by bus. The park is home to more than 1500 Japanese macaques. Kijima Kogen is a resort which includes an 18-hole golf course and hotel alongside an amusement park. It is located on a plateau en route to Yufuin.

Beppu has not only usual hot springs but some sand and foot baths as well. One famous spot is "Beppu Kaihin Sunayu, Ashiyu", (”Beppu marine beach sand bath and foot bath"). It is 15 minutes by bus from Beppu station, on Route 10.

 is located in the center of the city, a 15-minute walk from Beppu Station. Beppu Fireworks Festival, held in late July, is one of the biggest fireworks displays in Oita. Five thousand fireworks are set off from boats floating on Beppu Bay. Beppu Contemporary Art Festival "Mixed Bathing World" is an art festival held every three years in Beppu.

The Beppu Ropeway connects Beppu with Mount Tsurumi.

Education
 Beppu University, a private university first chartered in 1954, also has a campus in Oita City.
 Beppu Mizobe Gakuen College, established in 1986, is a private junior college located in the north of Beppu.
 Ritsumeikan Asia Pacific University, a private university established in 2000.

Sports
Beppu is home to the Oita Heat Devils basketball team. The team's season was canceled in 2011 due to the earthquake that struck Japan on March 11.

International relations
The city of Beppu has sister city relationships with the following locations.

  Atami, Shizuoka, Japan (since August 5, 1966)
  Bath, Somerset, England, United Kingdom (since October 31, 1994)
  Beaumont, Texas, United States (since May 20, 1985)
  Jeju, South Korea (since January 17, 2003)
  Mokpo, Jeollanam-do, South Korea (since October 1, 1984)
  Rotorua, Bay of Plenty Region, New Zealand (since July 10, 1987)
  Yantai, Shandong, China (since July 26, 1985)

Buildings
 Beppu Tower

References

External links

 Beppu City official website 
 Beppu City official website 
 Beppu Navi homepage
 Information about the "hells" hot springs
 Information about hot spring baths in Beppu

 
Cities in Ōita Prefecture
Holy cities
Populated coastal places in Japan
Port settlements in Japan